This is a summary of the electoral history of Grant Robertson, Deputy Leader of the New Zealand Labour Party (2011–13), Minister of Finance (2017–) and Member of Parliament for  (2008–).

Parliamentary elections

2008 election

2011 election

Electorate (as at 26 November 2011): 48,316

2014 election

2017 election

2020 election

Labour party leadership elections

2013 leadership election
Source:

2014 leadership election

Notes

References

Robertson, Grant